Kalateh-ye Ebrahimabad (also Romanized as Kalāteh-ye Ebrāhīmābād; also known as Kalāteh-ye Ebrāhīm Khān) is a village in Shandiz Rural District, Shandiz District, Torqabeh and Shandiz County, Razavi Khorasan Province, Iran. At the 2006 census, its population was 203, in 48 families.

References 

Populated places in Torqabeh and Shandiz County